Ahrensbök Charterhouse (German: Kartause Ahrensbök) was a Carthusian monastery, or charterhouse, in Ahrensbök in Holstein, Germany.

History

Monastery
The charterhouse was established in 1397. The estates with which it was endowed reached as far as Scharbeutz on the Bay of Lübeck.

During the Reformation the monastery was secularised, and with its estates fell into the hands of John II, Duke of Schleswig-Holstein-Sonderburg, in 1584, who had the buildings demolished.

Castle
The building materials were used between 1593 and 1601 for the construction of the castle in Ahrensbök, Schloss Hoppenbrook, which was the principal residence between 1623 and 1636 of the ruler of the newly formed Duchy of Schleswig-Holstein-Sonderburg-Plön while Duke Joachim Ernst I's new castle in Plön (Schloss Plön) was under construction. Once Schloss Plön was finished, the ducal residence was moved there from Ahrensbök, leaving Schloss Hoppenbrook as a secondary residence.

After the death there in 1740 of Duchess Juliane Luise, widow of Joachim Frederick, Duke of Schleswig-Holstein-Sonderburg-Plön, Schloss Hoppenbrook was demolished. The Rathaus of Ahrensbök now stands on its site, in a park in which ditches from the previous castle complex can still be made out.

Monastery church
The only surviving building from the time of the Carthusians is the Brick Gothic St. Mary's church - Marienkirche - which in fact was begun in the first quarter of the 14th century and thus predates the monastery itself: when the charterhouse was established it was taken over for use as the monastery church. It was extended several times, and in 1400 the polygonal quire was added. The tower, with an inscribed sandstone tablet over the portal, was not added until 1761.

Notes

Sources
 Jarchov, Otto, 1978: Die Klostergrundherrschaft Ahrensbök, in Jahrbuch für Heimatkunde, Eutin 1978, pp. 30–38
 Neugebauer, W., 1957: Schönes Holstein, pp. 84–85. Lübecker Nachrichten: Lübeck
 Rönnpag, Otto, 1992: Das Kartäuserkloster in Ahrensbök, in Jahrbuch für Heimatkunde, Eutin 1992, pp. 88–92

1397 establishments in Europe
1390s establishments in the Holy Roman Empire
1580s disestablishments in the Holy Roman Empire
Buildings and structures in Ostholstein
Carthusian monasteries in Germany
Lutheran churches in Schleswig-Holstein
Monasteries in Schleswig-Holstein
Religious buildings and structures completed in 1397